Abdulkhamid Khuseynovich Akhilgov (born 31 August 1980) is a Russian former professional football player.

Club career
He made his Russian Football National League debut for FC Angusht Nazran on 26 March 2006 in a game against FC Terek Grozny. He played one more season in the FNL for Angusht.

External links
 

1980 births
Living people
Russian footballers
People from Ingushetia
Association football midfielders
Russian expatriate footballers
Expatriate footballers in Moldova
FC Dacia Chișinău players
FC Angusht Nazran players
Moldovan Super Liga players